TSV Großbardorf is a German association football club from the city of Großbardorf, Bavaria. The footballers are part of a 602 member sports club that also has departments for bowling and table tennis.

History

The club made its first appearance in the Landesliga Bayern-Nord (V) in 1993 where they became a competitive side after the turn of the millennium. Following a second-place result and a successful promotion playoff in 2003, Grossbardorf advanced to the Bayernliga (IV) where they played several seasons as a lower table side. They narrowly avoided relegation after a poor 15th-place finish in 2006–07.

The country's football competition was restructured in 2008 with the introduction of the new 3. Liga. TSV's performance markedly improved and they finished their 2007–08 campaign in fourth place, which advanced the side out of the now fifth tier Oberliga to the Regionalliga Süd (IV) for the 2008–09 season. Due to Regionalliga legislations on stadium size, TSV Großbardorf had to move to Willy-Sachs-Stadion in Schweinfurt for its home games.

They lasted only a single season at this level, returning to the Bayernliga for 2009–10. At the end of the 2011–12 campaign, TSV qualified for the promotion round to the new Regionalliga Bayern (IV), but was knocked out by BC Aichach in the first round. The league was split into northern and southern divisions and the club is now part of the former.

TSV Großbardorf finished third in the league in 2012–13 but qualified for the promotion round after second-placed Jahn Forchheim declined the opportunity. In the play-offs the team lost 8–4 on aggregate to Regionalliga side SpVgg Bayern Hof, mainly because of a humiliating 1–6 home defeat in the first leg. Before the start of the 2013–14 season the club unveiled a new logo and also announced that it had sold the naming rights to its stadium, now renamed the Bioenergie-Arena.

Honors
The club's honours:

League
 Bezirksoberliga Unterfranken (VI)
 Champions: 1996–97
 Landesliga Bayern-Nord (V)
 Runners-up: 2002–03

Cup
 Unterfranken Cup
 Winner: 2000

Recent managers
Recent managers of the club:

Recent seasons
The recent season-by-season performance of the club:

With the introduction of the Bezirksoberligas in 1988 as the new fifth tier, below the Landesligas, all leagues below dropped one tier. With the introduction of the Regionalligas in 1994 and the 3. Liga in 2008 as the new third tier, below the 2. Bundesliga, all leagues below dropped one tier. With the establishment of the Regionalliga Bayern as the new fourth tier in Bavaria in 2012 the Bayernliga was split into a northern and a southern division, the number of Landesligas expanded from three to five and the Bezirksoberligas abolished. All leagues from the Bezirksligas onwards were elevated one tier.

References

External links
 Official team site
 TSV Großbardorf at Weltfussball
 Das deutsche Fußball-Archiv historical German domestic league tables (in German)

Football clubs in Germany
Football clubs in Bavaria
Association football clubs established in 1923
Football in Lower Franconia
1923 establishments in Germany
Rhön-Grabfeld